The 2000–01 Danish Cup was the 47th installment of the Danish Cup, the highest football competition in Denmark.

Final

References

2000-01
2000–01 domestic association football cups
Cup